Tove Elise Madland (born 10 March 1965) is a Norwegian politician for the Labour Party. She has been a member of the Storting since 2021.

Career

Hailing from Randaberg, Madland settled in Vindafjord as health worker, and has been active in trade unions and local politics. She was a member of the municipal council of Vindafjord from 1995, and served as deputy mayor in Vindafjord from 2019 to 2021.

She was elected representative to the Storting from the constituency of Rogaland for the period 2021–2025, for the Labour Party. In the Storting, she was a member of the Standing Committee on Scrutiny and Constitutional Affairs from 2021.

References

1965 births
Living people
Labour Party (Norway) politicians
Rogaland politicians
Members of the Storting
Women members of the Storting